Ōfuna Station is a railway station in Kamakura, Kanagawa, Japan, operated by the East Japan Railway Company (JR East).

Lines
Ōfuna Station is served by the Tokaido Main Line, Shōnan-Shinjuku Line, Negishi Line (Keihin-Tōhoku Line), Yokosuka Line, as well as the Shonan Monorail. It is 46.5 km from the terminus of the Tōkaidō Main Line at Tokyo Station.

Station layout
Ōfuna Station is an elevated station with five island platforms serving a total of 11 tracks. The adjacent Shonan Monorail station has a single bay platform.

There are above-track station buildings at both ends of the platforms, toward Fujisawa and toward Totsuka, offering passage between lines inside the ticket gates. The Kashio River, which runs between the two current station buildings, is a city boundary, meaning that the end of the station near Fujisawa is in Kamakura, while the end toward Totsuka is in Sakae-ku, Yokohama. However, the station master's office is, as was before the station's rebuilding, on the Kamakura side, so the station is treated as a Kamakura station, and not considered to be within the city of Yokohama.

The Fujisawa-side station building has the southern ticket gates and connects to East and West exits. The station building is connected by a passageway beside the building to the Shonan Monorail station. There is also a Midori no Madoguchi staffed ticket office and a View Plaza travel agency.

In the Totsuka-side station building is the northern ticket gate, connected to the Kasama Entrance.

Platforms

History 

Ōfuna Station opened on November 1, 1888 as a station on the Tōkaidō Main Line. The Yokosuka Line between Ōfuna and Yokosuka opened on June 16, 1889. Freight operations began in 1894.

In May 1966, the Yokohama Dreamland Monorail began operations from Ōfuna to Yokohama Dreamland, an amusement park built some 7 km north of the station. However, the monorail stopped running in September 1967 after cracks were found in the guideway.

On March 7, 1970 another monorail began operations from Ōfuna to the south. This Shonan Monorail eventually connected the station to Enoshima.

Passenger statistics
In fiscal 2013, the JR East station was used by an average of 97,118 passengers daily (boarding passengers only), making it the 42nd-busiest station operated by JR East.  A total of 4,817,536 passengers used the Shōnan Monorail station in fiscal 2012. The daily average passenger figures (boarding passengers only) for JR East in previous years are as shown below.

See also

 List of railway stations in Japan

References

External links 

 JR East Ōfuna Station 
 Shonan Monorail Ōfuna Station 

Railway stations in Kanagawa Prefecture
Railway stations in Japan opened in 1888
Tōkaidō Main Line
Yokosuka Line
Negishi Line
Shōnan-Shinjuku Line
Shonan Monorail Enoshima Line
Stations of Shonan Monorail